Harold Bartlett (July 26, 1887 – September 14, 1955) was an American sports shooter. He competed in three events at the 1912 Summer Olympics.

References

1887 births
1955 deaths
American male sport shooters
Olympic shooters of the United States
Shooters at the 1912 Summer Olympics
People from Old Lyme, Connecticut
Sportspeople from Connecticut